Porrittia herzi is a moth of the family Pterophoridae.

References

Moths described in 2001
Pterophorini